Parentia is a large genus of flies in the family Dolichopodidae.

Species

 Parentia agama Bickel, 2002
 Parentia angustipennis (Loew, 1858)
 Parentia anomalicosta Bickel, 1992
 Parentia aotearoa Bickel, 1992
 Parentia argenticauda Bickel, 2002
 Parentia argentifrons Bickel, 1992
 Parentia asymmetrica Grichanov, 2000
 Parentia backyama Bickel, 1994
 Parentia barbarae Bickel, 1994
 Parentia bourail Bickel, 2002
 Parentia bourgoini Bickel, 2002
 Parentia cagiae Bickel, 2006
 Parentia caldyanup Bickel, 1994
 Parentia calignosa Bickel, 1992
 Parentia cardaleae Bickel, 1994
 Parentia caudisetae Bickel, 2002
 Parentia chaineyi Bickel, 1994
 Parentia chathamensis Bickel, 1992
 Parentia cilifoliata (Parent, 1933)
 Parentia defecta Bickel, 1992
 Parentia degener (Parent, 1934)
 Parentia dispar (Macquart, 1850)
 Parentia do Bickel, 2002
 Parentia dongara Bickel, 1994
 Parentia dubia (Parent, 1929)
 Parentia fuscata (Hutton, 1901)
 Parentia gemmans (Walker, 1849)
 Parentia gemmata (Walker, 1849)
 Parentia gladicauda Bickel, 1994
 Parentia griseicollis (Becker, 1922)
 Parentia hollowayi Bickel, 2002
 Parentia incomitata Bickel, 2002
 Parentia insularis Bickel, 1992
 Parentia johnsi Bickel, 1992
 Parentia kelseyi Bickel, 1994
 Parentia kiwarrak Bickel, 1994
 Parentia lamellata Bickel, 2002
 Parentia lydiae Bickel, 2002
 Parentia lyra Bickel, 1992
 Parentia magnicornis Grichanov, 2021
 Parentia magniseta Bickel, 1992
 Parentia malitiosa (Hutton, 1901)
 Parentia milleri (Parent, 1933)
 Parentia mobilis (Hutton, 1901)
 Parentia modesta (Parent, 1933)
 Parentia nigropilosa (Macquart, 1847)
 Parentia nova (Parent, 1933)
 Parentia nudicosta Bickel, 1994
 Parentia occidentalis Bickel, 1994
 Parentia october Bickel, 2002
 Parentia orientalis Bickel, 1994
 Parentia ouenguip Bickel, 2002
 Parentia paniensis Bickel, 2002
 Parentia pernodensis Bickel, 2002
 Parentia perthensis Bickel, 1994
 Parentia pukakiensis Bickel, 1992
 Parentia recticosta (Parent, 1933)
 Parentia restricta (Hutton, 1901)
 Parentia royallensis Bickel, 1994
 Parentia sarramea Bickel, 2002
 Parentia schlingeri Bickel, 1992
 Parentia solaris Bickel, 1994
 Parentia stenura (Loew, 1858)
 Parentia substenura Grichanov, 1999
 Parentia theroni Grichanov, 2021
 Parentia timothyei Bickel, 1994
 Parentia tinda Bickel, 1994
 Parentia titirangi Bickel, 1992
 Parentia tonnoiri (Parent, 1933)
 Parentia tricenta Bickel, 2002
 Parentia tricolor (Walker, 1835)
 Parentia varifemorata Bickel, 1992
 Parentia vulgaris Bickel, 1994
 Parentia webbi Bickel, 2002
 Parentia whirinaki Bickel, 1992
 Parentia wilhelmensis Bickel & Martin, 2016
 Parentia yarragil Bickel, 1994
 Parentia yeatesi Bickel, 1994
 Parentia yunensis Bickel, 1994

References 

Dolichopodidae genera
Sciapodinae
Diptera of Australasia